Following is a list of collegiate chapters of Kappa Alpha Theta international women's fraternity. Active chapters are indicated in bold. Inactive chapters are indicated in italic.

Notes

References 

Lists of chapters of United States student societies by society
Kappa Alpha Theta